Laterocaudata is a genus of cnidarians belonging to the family Myxobolidae.

Species:
 Laterocaudata mastacembela Chen & Hsieh, 1984

References

Myxobolidae
Cnidarian genera